The New England tree frog or glandular tree frog (Ranoidea subglandulosa) is a species of frog in the subfamily Pelodryadinae, endemic to Australia. Its natural habitats are temperate forests, subtropical or tropical moist lowland forests, subtropical or tropical moist montane forests, temperate shrubland, rivers, and pastureland.
It is threatened by habitat loss.

Description
The male New England tree frog reaches a snout-to-vent length of  while the females reach . The upper parts are green or greenish-brown often flecked with black. A white line runs along the upper lip and a straw-coloured line runs from the snout, through the eyes and tympani to the groin. The lower parts of the sides and the back of the thighs are bright orange-red. There are enlarged pads on the digits enabling the frog to climb. This frog is very similar in appearance to the Blue Mountains tree frog but as their ranges do not overlap, there is little chance of confusion. The skin is smooth whereas in the closely related and similar-looking Davies' tree frog the skin usually has small raised bumps.

Distribution
Its range extends northwards from the Werrikimbe National Park in New South Wales to southern Queensland and in the Nowendoc area it is the most common species of frog present in streams. It is an adaptable species and occurs in both wet and dry sclerophyll forests, in mountain woodland and cleared pasture. It is likely to be present in any stream with well-vegetated verges.

Behaviour
Male frogs start calling at night in August or September and the breeding season continues until December, the call being described as a series of “orak..orak..orak” sounds continuing for about ten seconds. The males advertise their presence from logs or low vegetation beside streams, especially favouring Callicoma and Lomandra. The eggs are laid in shady parts of the stream and attached to submerged vegetation. It is not known on what the tadpoles feed but the adult frogs are presumed to eat small invertebrates. Their habits outside the breeding season are little known.

Status
It is an uncommon frog and its habitat is threatened by clearance of vegetation along riverbanks and by pollution, and some of the streams in which the frog breeds have been stocked with exotic fish such as trout. For these reasons, the IUCN has assessed this frog as being a "vulnerable species".

References

Ranoidea (genus)
Amphibians of New South Wales
Amphibians described in 1983
Taxonomy articles created by Polbot
Frogs of Australia
Taxobox binomials not recognized by IUCN